The 2008–09 season was Nottingham Forest's first season back in the Football League Championship, following promotion from League One in the 2007–08 season, after spending three years in the third tier. Forest finished in 19th place, seven points above the relegation zone, having been involved in the relegation scrap all season, with Billy Davies changing fortunes around to secure Championship status for the 2009–10 season.

Team kit

|

|

|

Technical staff

Pre-season and friendlies

Summary
Forest had a busy pre-season, making six promising signings, with seven players leaving as they prepared for the 2008–09 season. The players to come in were Welsh international striker Robert Earnshaw on a three-year deal for £2.65 million, Liverpool midfielder Paul Anderson on a one-year loan, ex-Manchester United striker Andrew Cole on a 12-month contract, French midfielder Guy Moussi from Angers SCO, striker Mickael Darnet from AS Cannes and Joe Garner from Carlisle United for £1.14 million. Those departing Forest were striker Grant Holt to Shrewsbury Town, Northern Ireland international midfielder Sammy Clingan to Norwich City, Ghanaian international striker Junior Agogo to Egyptian side Zamalek Sporting Club, left-back Matt Lockwood to Colchester United and midfielder Kris Commons to Derby County.

Forest had a reasonably successful pre-season, winning four, drawing one and losing two in their seven pre-season fixtures. Their warm-ups included two games against Premier League opposition in Everton and Sunderland. Forest were then asked to partake in a friendly against a second-string Republic of Ireland side on 9 October during the international break, which Forest lost 2–0.

Results

Coca-Cola Championship

Summary
Forest kicked off the 2008–09 season with a goalless home draw against Reading before suffering their first league defeat in the Championship in a 3–1 loss at Swansea City. With four strikers injured, Forest secured the loan signing of Manchester United forward Lee Martin. Martin started the scoring in the 3–2 success over Watford with a 25-yard curler; the victory was Forest's first of the Championship campaign. Robert Earnshaw netted his first league goal for the club in the victory, with Nathan Tyson, returning from injury, taking just four minutes after stepping off the bench to net the winner to put Forest 14th in the league table. Forest finished the month with a 5–1 defeat to Wolves, who went top of the Championship following the result. This marked Tyson's first start of the season after a hamstring injury. Forest picked up one point in five games during September in a 0–0 home draw against Charlton sandwiched by 2–1 loses to both Burnley and Preston, and losses at Plymouth and Sheffield Wednesday. Forest then lost their first two games in October with a 2–0 home loss to Crystal Palace and a 2–1 defeat at QPR. They won a home point against Ipswich Town but lost again four days later to Cardiff City, with both goals conceded both penalties. This run of poor form saw Forest prop up the Championship. With two away games coming up, it was being touted that manager Colin Calderwood faced the sack if they could not record a victory, but they did with a 2–1 away victory at Crystal Palace, with goals coming from midfielders Chris Cohen and Matt Thornhill. This was Forest's first win in ten games and in more than two months, and saw Forest them off the foot of the league.

November started with the East Midlands derby against Derby County at Pride Park Stadium, the first time the two teams had met in a competitive fixture in over three years. The match proved to be controversial, with Emanuel Villa scoring at both ends to make the score 1–1. Lewis McGugan was given a straight red card, then a 93rd-minute penalty for Derby was saved by former Ram Lee Camp, with manager Colin Calderwood commenting after that the save would go down in the folklore. Veteran striker Andrew Cole then had his contract cancelled by "mutual consent" after the ex-Manchester United forward had fallen out with the club, as he was often being left on the bench. Forest followed up the Derby draw with another 1–1 draw at home to promotion-chasing Birmingham City and then a 2–2 draw away to Bristol City; the latter match saw Camp save another injury-time penalty and a point, seeing Forest into a four-game unbeaten run. However, they then lost 2–1 at home to Norwich City to return to the bottom of the table. A further 0–0 away draw at relegation rivals Doncaster Rovers saw mass tabloid speculation that manager Colin Calderwood was set to be replaced by Billy Davies. In the next game, at home to Barnsley, Forest won by a 36th-minute header from Joe Garner, moving off the foot of the table to 23rd. Forest drew 2–2 at Coventry City, twice coming from behind to claim a point, but their poor home form continued with a 1–0 home loss to Sheffield United and a 0–0 draw against relegation rivals Blackpool. Forest then recorded an important victory away at Southampton, with defender Wes Morgan scoring his first goal of the season and Joe Garner chipping the goalkeeper from 35 yards. This took Forest to just one point off safety, with their next game at home to bottom-of-the-table Doncaster Rovers, but Forest were 4–0 down within an hour and down to ten men for much of the second half after Julian Bennett came off injured after Forest had used all their substitutions, with a cruciate-ligament injury ruling the left-back out for the rest of the season. Forest replied with two late goals, but immediately after the game the Forest board terminated manager Colin Calderwood's contract after two and a half years in charge of the club; assistant manager David Kerslake was also dismissed. Reserve-team manager John Pemberton took caretaker charge at Norwich City, which Forest won 3–2 to rise out of the relegation zone for the first time in three months; this game saw the end of Lee Camp's loan spell. On 1 January, Nottingham Forest appointed Billy Davies as their new manager, signing a three-and-a-half-year deal with David Kelly named as his assistant manager. Davies watched the next match, against nouveau-riche Premier League side Manchester City in the FA Cup third round, which saw Forest won 3–0 with goals from strikers Nathan Tyson, Robert Earnshaw and Joe Garner. Davies' first game in charge saw Forest go to bottom of the table Charlton Athletic and beat the strugglers 2–0, with Tyson and Earnshaw netting for the Reds. Their third victory in a row pushed Forest up to 21st and moved them closer to teams directly above them. A 2–0 home win Plymouth Argyle moved them into 20th before a big rival match in the FA Cup against Derby County at Pride Park, which ended 1–1. There will be a replay on 4 February at the City Ground. This was followed up by a 2–1 home win against Sheffield Wednesday, in which Forest came from behind to win. The result put them 17th, four points clear of the relegation zone. February saw just one win for Forest at the end of the month against promotion chasing Reading. Forest lost their opening game of February to local rivals Derby in the FA Cup. Forest then drew 1–1 with QPR before going on a three-game losing streak to Birmingham City, Ipswich Town and Derby this time in the league. After the bitter disappointment of picking up just one victory in February, Forest were looking to get off to the best possible start, and they did against Preston in a 2–1 victory with a brace from Rob Earnshaw sending Forest three places up the table into 18th and looking a lot less likely to face the drop after another good result this time a 1–1 draw to Swansea City. However another three game losing streak to Watford, a 5–0 loss to Burnley and then a 1–0 defeat to Wolves thanks to a Michael Kightly goal saw Forest take another dramatic downturn and they slipped in the league table to the regulation place of 22nd. Forest knew that with just six games left to stay in the Championship they needed something special. After a 1–1 draw against Barnsley following a desperate equaliser from Rob Earnshaw, Forest still sat in the drop zone. Up next were Bristol City, when city went ahead through Ivan Sproule things looked bleak again at the City Ground. Rob Earnshaw again showed his fantastic ability to score vital goals after grabbing an equaliser but with twelve minutes to go Forest went 2–1 down thanks to Dele Adebola. Forest turned things round in a fantastic comeback, Joe Garner making it 2–2 and then in stoppage time on loan Dexter Blackstock grabbed the late winner to give Forest a vital three points and climb themselves out of the drop zone. A midweek match against Sheffield United followed the fantastic win against City but it was a dull affair. After Kelvin Wilson was sent off early on, Forest's best chance fell to Joe Garner who fired over the crossbar and the Red's had to settle for a 0–0 draw that put them back into the drop zone on goal difference with Barnsley. Coventry City was the next opponents Forest had to face. Forest seemed more likely too pick up a result as the match was at the City Ground following the hysterics last week against Bristol City. And the only goal from James Perch after 46 minutes gave Forest a well-deserved win sending them up to 20th and out the drop zone, however they could not be complacent yet as both Norwich City and Barnsley, the two teams behind them had games in hand. Following the draw at Coventry, Forest saw that both Barnsley and Norwich failed to pick up a result that threatened Forest's safety. The early kick off saw on 25 April saw Forest hold Blackpool to a 1–1 draw at Bloomfield Road. Barnsley played Wolves and looked to have won what was a vital game however a late equaliser for Wolves saw Forest with a chance to stay up if Norwich were to lose to Reading. And they did, two goals from Shane Long meant Forest had escaped the drop. On the final day Forest beat already relegated Southampton 3–1 and secure 19th place just behind rivals Derby County.

Results

Results by round

League table

League Cup

Results

FA Cup

Results

Squad statistics

Appearances and goals
The statistics for the following players are for their time during 2008–09 season playing for Nottingham Forest. Any stats from a different club during 2008–09 are not included.

 Nottingham Forest have also had four own-goals scored for them during 2008–09

 

 

|}

Top scorers
Last updated on 26 October 2008.

Disciplinary record
Last updated on 19 July 2009.

Includes cards collected whilst at other clubs during 2008–09

Transfers

In

Out

Loans in

Loans out

Notes

Nottingham Forest F.C. seasons
Nottingham Forest